Duel Magical is a 1982 board game published by Ragnarok Enterprises.

Gameplay
Duel Magical is a game designed by Dave Nalle involving conflict between mages in an arena.

Reception
Ronald Pehr reviewed Duel Magical in The Space Gamer No. 51. Pehr commented that "Duel Magical is too abstract and simple to suit most gamers; repeated playings will tarnish the novelty. But it's rousing good entertainment, equally playable by novices or hardbitten wargaming veterans, is an excellent diversion, and has more of the flavor of a fantasy magic duel than any game I've played."

Reviews
Pegasus #8 (July/Aug., 1982)

References

Board games introduced in 1982